"Special Needs" is a song by English alternative rock band Placebo. It was released as the third single from their fourth studio album, Sleeping with Ghosts, on 15 September 2003. It peaked at No. 27 in the UK Singles Chart.

Music video
The music video for "Special Needs" was filmed in a disused swimming pool in Hackney. It alternates between showing the three band members playing the song and featuring a couple, apparently separated, reminiscing their relationship and making out. The female part in the video was played by Caroline Farrington.

Track listing

 7" vinyl

"Special Needs"
"English Summer Rain (Freelance Hellraiser Mix)"

 DVD

"Special Needs" (video)
"Making of the Video"
"Special Needs (Album Version)"
"The Bitter End (Junior Sanchez Mix)"

Personnel
Helena Berg – sleeve photography and art direction

References

External links

Placebo (band) songs
Songs written by Steve Hewitt
Songs written by Brian Molko
Songs written by Stefan Olsdal
2003 singles
2003 songs
Song recordings produced by Jim Abbiss
Virgin Records singles